Thiakry (also spelled thiacry or chakery) or Degue is a sweet millet couscous dish originating in West Africa.  The wheat or millet granules are mixed with milk, sweetened condensed milk, or yogurt, as well as dried fruit such as raisins, desiccated coconut, and spices such as nutmeg.

References

Senegalese cuisine